The Lithuanian Swimming Federation is the national federation for Aquatics in body of swimming in Lithuania, as well as the other Aquatics sports: diving, artistic swimming and open water swimming. It is a non-profit organization that was founded in 1924. During Soviet Union occupation federation was closed and re-founded at 1991. It is both a member of LEN and FINA.

Organization
President: Saulius Binevičius
Vice-president: Arūnas Gabrilavičius
General Secretary: Justas Kalinauskas

Competitions 
The Lithuanian Swimming Federation organizes the Lithuanian Swimming Championships, the Lithuanian Artistic Swimming Championships, the Lithuanian Diving Championships, and the Lithuanian Open Water Swimming Championships, national junior and youth championships.

Current head coach for the Lithuanian swimming national team is Žilvinas Ovsiukas.

Medalists at Olympic Games

Medalists at World Championships

See also 
List of Lithuanian records in swimming
Lithuanian Swimming Championships

References

External links
Lietuvos plaukimo federacija Official website

National members of FINA
Sports governing bodies in Lithuania
Swimming in Lithuania
Swimming organizations